Émile Rummelhardt (12 January 1914 – 15 January 1978) was a French professional footballer and manager.

Career 
Alsatian Émile Rummelhardt played as defender or midfielder for Troyes, FC Mulhouse and Girondins de Bordeaux.

He was manager of Le Mans (1948–51), Gien (1951–52), FC Metz (1952–55), FC Mulhouse (1955–58), US Forbach (1958–59), FC Mulhouse (1959–62), AS Cherbourg (1962–67), Stade de Reims (1967–69), FC Lorient (1969–71) and Stade Malherbe Caen (1972–74). As well as having managed Swiss sides FC Sion and FC Zürich,

He won the Coupe de France in 1941 with Girondins de Bordeaux.

His son is the former ambassador Jacques Rummelhardt.

References

1914 births
1978 deaths
Footballers from Mulhouse
Association football defenders
French footballers
FC Girondins de Bordeaux players
FC Mulhouse players
ES Troyes AC players
French football managers
Stade Malherbe Caen managers
Le Mans FC managers
FC Lorient managers
FC Metz managers
Stade de Reims managers
FC Mulhouse managers